The 2018 Women's Hockey Champions Trophy was the 23rd and last edition of the Hockey Champions Trophy for women. It was held between 17 and 25 November 2018 in Changzhou, China.

The Netherlands won the tournament for the seventh time after defeating Australia 5–1 in the final, tying the record of seven titles previously set by Argentina in 2016.

Host city change
When the FIH unveiled the event hosts for the 2015–2018 cycle, Argentina was chosen to host this tournament. However, in March 2016, the FIH had to terminate all contractual agreements with Argentina as the Argentine Hockey Confederation was unable to fulfil their contractual obligations in regards to television rights, sponsorship and the hosting of events. Changzhou was announced as the host instead.

Qualification
Alongside the host nation, the defending champions, the last Olympic, World Cup and World League champions qualified automatically. The remaining spots were nominated by the FIH Executive Board, making a total of six competing teams. If teams qualified under more than once criteria, the additional teams were invited by the FIH Executive Board as well.

 (Host nation)
 (Defending champions)
 (Champions of 2016 Summer Olympics)
 (Champions of 2016–17 World League and the 2018 Hockey World Cup)
 (Invited by the FIH Executive Board)
 (Invited by the FIH Executive Board)

Squads

Head coach: Agustín Corradini

Head coach: Paul Gaudoin

 

Head coach: Huang Yongsheng

Head coach: David Ralph

Head coach: Anthony Farry

Head coach: Alyson Annan

Results
All times are local (UTC+8).

Standings

Fixtures

Classification

Fifth and sixth place

Third and fourth place

Final

Statistics

Final standings

Awards
The following individual awards were given at the conclusion of the tournament.

Goalscorers

References

External links
Official website

Women's Hockey Champions Trophy
Champions Trophy
Hockey Champions Trophy
Hockey Champions Trophy
International women's field hockey competitions hosted by China
Changzhou
Sport in Jiangsu